Wang Zhen (April 11, 1908 – March 12, 1993) was a Chinese political figure and one of the Eight Elders of the Chinese Communist Party. He was the 4th Vice President of China and served under Chinese Presidents Yang Shangkun and Li Xiannian. Wang Zhen was the first Vice Chairman to serve in the Central Advisory Commission, under Chinese leader Deng Xiaoping.

Early career 
Born in 1908, his first job aged 16 was as an labor in a railway station office, but he was dismissed after slapping a foreign woman, the wife of a foreign manager of the railroad. After an unsuccessful bank robbery in the name of revolution Wang joined the Long March which happens to be where he was fleeing from lawman. He took part in the 1934-5 Long March. In 1942, after Mao appointed Wang to head a rectification of Communist writers, he responded by citing his lack of schooling. Mao responded that "It's just someone without much education that I want to deal with these cultural people."

During World War II when the communist base in northwestern China was blockaded by Kuomintang forces under the command of Hu Zongnan, Wang Zhen gained fame as the brigade commander of the 359th Brigade for successfully converting waste land in Nanniwan into productive farm land, and the agricultural output not only supported the brigade itself, but also with a substantial surplus to support other parts of the communist base.  The success was later lauded by the communists as an example of self-sufficiency.

In October 1945, one month after the surrender of the Japanese, Wang was promoted to lead one of the seven columns of the Northwest Field Army, under the command of Peng Dehuai. Wang fought against the Kuomintang until most of Chiang Kai-shek's forces were withdrawn to Taiwan in September 1949. In October Wang's forces were directed by Peng to occupy Xinjiang. Most defenders surrendered peacefully to Wang and were incorporated into the PLA.

Wang was head of the military government in Xinjiang from 1950 to 1952 and earned a reputation for brutality towards the native Uyghurs, writing to Mao Zedong that they were "a troublemaking minority" and suggested they be "thoroughly wiped out" to avoid any future problems. Mao apparently thought this too extreme, and Wang was redeployed, but Wang remains a folk-hero among Han Chinese settlers in Xinjiang to the present day, while  Uyghur mothers in Xinjiang still warn their children to be good "or else Wang Zhen will come and get you."

A local legend circulating among the Han Chinese population in Xinjiang recounts that in 1950, as Wang Zhen conquered southern Xinjiang, a Han man had prepared a meal of pork in a Uyghur village, and was killed by the villagers, who were offended as pork is prohibited in Islam. Wang Zhen then had his troops surround the village, forced the villagers to hand over the perpetrators and publicly executed them in the village square. Afterwards, he had his troops slaughter pigs and boil them, upon which the troops then forced all remaining residents of the village to eat a bowl of boiled pork at bayonet point.

In the 1950s Wang coerced thousands of Hunanese women into sexual servitude at PLA units in Xinjiang.

In 1951, Wang Zhen decided to build a new base for the People's Liberation Army and selected the location of current Shihezi. Zhao Xiguang (赵锡光) took charge in the development of the city, and established the Xinjiang Production and Construction Corps in 1954.

In the People's Republic of China 
After the communist revolution, Wang Zhen was one of only two Chinese commanders who were authorized to carry guns when visiting Mao Zedong.  The other one was Xu Shiyou (许世友), but Xu never carried a gun when visiting Mao.  Wang Zhen, on the other hand, wore his gun for his first visit. When stopped by Mao's bodyguards, Wang Zhen began to argue with them.  Mao investigated the noise, and told his bodyguards that he trusted Wang fully, and unless Wang was carrying atomic bombs, Wang could carry anything he wanted when he visited Mao.  After that incident, Wang never wore a weapon while visiting Mao.

Later years 

Despite his uncorrupt behavior in the 1950s and his strong support for Chinese economic reform, Wang Zhen was not popular among Chinese people after 1979 due to his political hard-line conservatism.  His support of Deng Xiaoping and being a member of his regime was largely due to his close personal friendship with Deng, which was further strengthened by their common opposition to radical political reforms.  As one of the architects of the suppression by force of the pro-democracy protesters in Tiananmen Square in 1989, he was quoted in the Tiananmen Papers as stating in a meeting with other Chinese Communist Party elders on June 2, 1989: "We should announce in advance to those people occupying the Square that we're coming in. They can listen or not as they choose, but then we move in. If it causes deaths, that's their own fault. We can't be soft or merciful toward anti-Party, anti-socialist elements." He served as the Vice-President of the People's Republic of China from 1988 to 1993 under President Yang Shangkun.

By the late 1980s, Wang's children were increasingly promoted in the Communist Party and amassing large business holdings and wealth. His eldest son Wang Jun was the head of CITIC Group, the largest State Investment group in China, while his younger son Wang Zhi, became head of China Computer Development Corporation, the first Chinese computer manufacturer. Wang Zhen, who remained an unrepentant Marxist, felt betrayed by his children's "Capitalist" lifestyles, according to one well-wisher who met him shortly before he died, allegedly calling them "Turtle eggs" (a slang term for bastards), "I don't acknowledge them as my sons".

In August 1989 a colonel in the People's Liberation Army, Zhang Zhenglong, published a 618-page reflection of his experiences fighting for the Red Army in Manchuria in the late 1940s, White Snow, Red Blood. In this book, Zhang claimed that Wang Zhen had smuggled opium during the Chinese Civil War. This and other claims made Zhang a target of Wang. Zhang was eventually arrested for making these claims, and his book was censored in mainland China.

See also 
 List of officers of the People's Liberation Army
 Wang Zhen's Former Residence

References

Citations

Sources 

 Domes, Jurgen. Peng Te-huai: The Man and the Image , London: C. Hurst & Company. 1985. .
 Uhalley Jr., Stephen, and Qiu, Jin. "The Lin Biao Incident: More Than Twenty Years Later" . Pacific Affairs. Vol.66, No. 3, Autumn, 1993. pp. 386–398. Retrieved December 15, 2011.

External links 
 

1908 births
1993 deaths
People's Liberation Army generals from Hunan
Vice presidents of the People's Republic of China
Chinese Communist Party politicians from Hunan
People's Republic of China politicians from Hunan
Politicians from Changsha
Political office-holders in Xinjiang
Members of the 12th Politburo of the Chinese Communist Party
Members of the 11th Politburo of the Chinese Communist Party
Xinjiang Production and Construction Corps